Onnik Dinkjian (born 1929) is a French-born American-Armenian musician and singer. He is the father of Ara Dinkjian and has appeared with his son as well as other Armenian musicians such as Roupen Altiparmakian playing oud.

Biography
He was born Jean-Joseph Miliyan in Paris, France, in 1929, the son of Garabed and Zorah from Dikranagerd (Diyarbakir), who both escaped persecution during the genocide. He and his sister, two years his senior, were orphaned five years after his birth. Garabed died when Jean-Joseph was not yet one year old.
Onnik first began taking an interest in music when he went to St. Gregory’s Armenian Church in Paris for the first time at the age of 10. They were adopted by his godparents, Nishan and Oghida Dinkjian, who were also from Dikranagerd, and continued to live in Paris. Growing up he learned not only fluent French and Armenian, but also the melodious dialect of Armenians from Dikranagerd.
Nishan Dinkjian went to Paris from Aleppo and worked various menial jobs before he fell into the wholesale banana business. When fruit became scarce after the war started in 1939, he went into clothing sales to support his family.

Onnik first began taking an interest in music when he went to St. Gregory’s Armenian Church in Paris for the first time at the age of 10. Every Sunday he would need to take two metro rides to get there. The sacred hymns of the liturgy sung by the choir and soloists aroused something within him that would change his life forever. “I absolutely fell in love with the music,” he said. “This is what brought me into the Armenian Church, not necessarily as a religious person but as a lover of the Armenian music.”

At the age of 17, in July 1946, Onnik and his family moved to the United States, Nishan Dinkjian’s two sisters had settled. They had been separated during the genocide but desired to live in close proximity with one another. Onnik entered the U.S. with his given name, but would later change it legally to Onnik Dinkjian in honor of his adoptive parents. 
In 1952, Onnik was drafted into the U.S. Army. In Germany he was assigned to the Winged Victory Chorus, a well-known group led by Joe Baris that performed a wide range of choral works, from composers as diverse as Puccini and Debussy to Rodgers and Hammerstein and Irving Berlin. “For a year and a half in Germany all I did was travel from one city to another with some famous American stars, like Eddie Fischer and Danny Kaye, all because of the music, my singing.” 
When he returned from the army, Onnik opened his own dry cleaning store and married Araksi Maksian (Mghsian) from Lyon, France, whose roots were in Kharpert. They had two children, Anahid and Ara.

He is a recipient of a 2020 National Heritage Fellowship awarded by the National Endowment for the Arts, which is the United States government's highest honor in the folk and traditional arts.

Discography
Voice of Armenians Onnik Dinkjian - with the song "Mayrus" (text by A. Issahakian and music by Badalian)
The Many Sides Of Onnik 1992 a rare recording of songs in Tigranakert dialect 
Inner Feelings of Onnik, album featuring Ne me quitte pas recorded by Onnik Dinkjian with John Berberian (oud)
All My Best

References

1929 births
Living people
American people of Armenian descent
French people of Armenian descent
National Heritage Fellowship winners